Piper candollei is a species of pepper plant in the family Piperaceae. It is endemic to Ecuador.

References

Flora of Ecuador
candollei
Data deficient plants
Taxonomy articles created by Polbot